Nelson Bocaranda Sardi (18 April, 1945, Boconó, Trujillo), is a Venezuelan television commentator and investigative journalist.  

Bocaranda Sardi began studying journalism in 1962 at the Universidad Católica Andrés Bello in Caracas and started working for television station RCTV in the early 1980s, then worked for television station Venevisión in the 1990s under Oscar Yanes, who was his journalism professor.  He has worked in several Venezuelan television stations as well as radio.  On Unión Radio, he has a weekday show, "Los Runrunes de Nelson", and he writes for several newspapers, including El Universal.

He received Venezuela's Premio Nacional de Periodismo (National Journalism Prize) and is considered one of the best Venezuelan journalists by his colleagues.

External links
 Venezuela strikes affect US oil supply, The World Today, abc.net.au
 Why Fox's Outrage? Chávez's Meddling in Mexico, Wall Street Journal
 Fidel's Successor in Latin America - Hugo Chavez, president of Venezuela, Insight on the News at findarticles.com
 The Gospel According to Hugo, Religion in the News
  Nelson Bocaranda, Venevision

Venezuelan television presenters
Venezuelan journalists
Living people
1945 births
Venezuelan people of Italian descent
Venezuelan radio presenters
Andrés Bello Catholic University alumni